Frank Petley (sometimes credited as Frank B. or Frank E. Petley) (28 March 1872 – 12 January 1945) was a British actor prominent in the Edwardian theatre and silent era cinema. During the Second World War he performed with The Old Vic Company then based at the Liverpool Playhouse, appearing as Nat Miller in Ah, Wilderness! by Eugene O'Neill in a production by Noel Willman.

Selected filmography
 The Chance of a Lifetime (1916)
 Diana and Destiny (1916)
 Ye Wooing of Peggy (1917)
 Nature's Gentleman (1918)
 The Silver Greyhound (1919)
 The Power of Right (1919)
 The Iron Stair (1920)
 The Flame (1920)
 My Lord Conceit (1921)
 The Golden Dawn (1921)
 The Mystery of Mr. Bernard Brown (1921)
 Melody of Death (1922)
 Night Ride (1937)

References

External links

1872 births
1945 deaths
English male stage actors
English male film actors
English male silent film actors
20th-century English male actors